Herby  is a village in Lubliniec County, Silesian Voivodeship, in southern Poland. It is the seat of the gmina (administrative district) called Gmina Herby. The village has a population of 2,421.

Herby was devastated by an F3 tornado on August 15, 2008.

References

Herby